Schefflera dolichostyla is a species of plant in the family Araliaceae. It is endemic to Peru.

References

Flora of Peru
dolichostyla
Vulnerable plants
Taxonomy articles created by Polbot
Taxobox binomials not recognized by IUCN